Ami Thumi is a 2017 Indian Telugu-language romantic comedy film written and directed by Mohanakrishna Indraganti. It stars Adivi Sesh, Eesha Rebba, Avasarala Srinivas, Aditi Myakal, Tanikella Bharani and Vennela Kishore. The film was produced by K C Narasimha Rao, music composed by Mani Sharma, and cinematography by P. G. Vinda.

Ami Tumi is loosely based on Richard Brinsley Sheridan comic opera The Duenna.

Plot
Ami Thumi is a situation comedy about two loving couples: Deepika (Eesha Rebba) and Ananth (Adivi Sesh), then Maya (Aditi Myakal) and Vijay (Avasarala Srinivas). The couple's fathers are business rivals, and Deepika's father Janardhan (Tanikella Bharani) objects to the relationship. While Maya opts to become a nun, Janardhan arranges a match to another man, Sri Chilipi (Vennela Kishore); however, Deepika tricks Sri Chillipi into helping them. The movie follows his plans to help them change Janardhan's mind.

Cast
Adivi Sesh as Ananth
Eesha Rebba as Deepika
Avasarala Srinivas as Vijay
Aditi Myakal as Maya
Tanikella Bharani as Janardhan, Vijay and Deepika's father
Vennela Kishore as Sri Chilipi
Jogini Shyamala Devi as Kumari,Vijay and Deepika's maid
Ananth Babu as Sarva Mangala Sastry "SMS"
Madhumani as Maya's stepmother
Kedar Shankar as Gangadhar, Maya's father
Venu Gopal as Pedda Chilipi, Sri Chilipi's father
Tanikella Bhargav as Kaashi
Thadivelu

Production 
Ami Tumi was shot in just 31 days, with post-production taking 13 more days.

Reception 
Reviewing the film for Firstpost, Hemanth Kumar appreciated the humour and performances and wrote, "Ami Thumi is a screwball comedy, there’s plenty of confusion and plenty of chasing around, but more than anything, it has a tone which has long been missing in Telugu cinema." Karthik Keramalu of The News Minute, also echoed the same, calling it "screwball comedy at its finest." Keramalu praised Kishore in particular, adding "it’s Kishore who enjoys the largest share of the pie. He’ll win a great number of awards next year for his zany character, Sri Chilipi." The Hindu critic Sangeetha Devi Dundoo also called Kishore "the star of the film," stating that making Sri Chilipi the pivotal character in this drama is where the surprise lied in. Reviewing other performances, Suresh Kaviryani of Deccan Chronicle wrote: " Adivi Sesh and Avasarala are the lead actors, but Adivi Sesh gets far more exposure; Avasarala’s role is like a cameo. Eesha is good and her Telangana accent authentic. Thanikella Bharani gets another important role and does well, experienced actor that he is."

Ch Sushil Rao of The Times of India felt that the film fared average with loose dots of laughter. Rao was critical of the technical aspects, writing, "There’s nothing much to talk about the locales or cinematography since most of it is shot indoors adhering to the demands of the screenplay. The music too is average and usually seats in the backseat throughout the story. " A reviewer from Sify wrote: "Ami Thumi doesn't have much story line but does generate some laughs."

Soundtrack
The music has been composed by Mani Sharma and released by Aditya Music.

References

External links 

2010s Telugu-language films
2017 films
Films scored by Mani Sharma
Indian romantic comedy films
 Films directed by Mohan Krishna Indraganti